Argyropoulos, feminine form Argyropoulou (Αργυροπούλου), is a Greek surname meaning "son of Argyros". It can refer to:

 Emmanouil Argyropoulos (1889–1913), Greek aviator
 John Argyropoulos (1415–1487), Byzantine Renaissance humanist
 Kimon Argyropoulo (1842—1918), Russian ambassador
 Leonidas Argyropoulos (born 1990), Greek football player
 Nikos Argyropoulos (born 1978), Greek basketball player
 Periklis Argyropoulos (admiral) (1871–1953), Greek admiral and diplomat

Greek-language surnames
Surnames